Tim Zinnemann (born April 15, 1940) is an American film producer, former assistant director, and photographer. He is best known for his work on the films The Cowboys, The Long Riders, The Running Man and The Island of Dr. Moreau.

Life and career
Zinnemann was born in Los Angeles, California, the son of director Fred Zinnemann and Renee Bartlett. He attended Columbia University, but left before graduation to work as a film editor in Italy.

He began his career as an assistant director on the film Harlow (1965). Other films followed such as Cast a Giant Shadow, What Did You Do in the War, Daddy? (both released in 1966), The Happening (1967), Bullitt (1968), and the Western television series Cimarron Strip. His other assistant directorial credits include The Great White Hope (1970), The Reivers (1969), Cinderella Liberty (1973), The Day of the Locust (1975), Farewell, My Lovely (1975) and Smile (1975).

He then became a line producer. His credits include Straight Time (1978), A Small Circle of Friends (1980), The Long Riders (1980), Impulse (1984), Fandango (1985), The Running Man (1987), Lies of the Twins (1991), Street Fighter and The Island of Dr. Moreau (1996), his last producing credit. In 1985, he directed an episode of Miami Vice, his only directing credit to date.

Since 1992, Zinnemann focused on photography, working for various publications.

Personal life
Zinnemann married his first wife, Anna Bellini, in Italy. He married his second wife, Sharon M. McLaglen, in 1967. The couple had one child before divorcing in 1972. In 1983, Zinnemann married actress Meg Tilly, who was 20 years his junior. Together they had two children, Emily (b. 1984) and David (b. 1986), before their divorce in 1989. Zinnemann's fourth marriage was to actress Christine M. Walton in 1995. They also had two children, before divorcing in 2001.

Filmography
He was a producer in all films unless otherwise noted.

Film

Second unit director or assistant director

Production manager

Editorial department

Thanks

Television

Second unit director or assistant director

As director

References

External links

1940 births
Film producers from California
American photographers
American television directors
Columbia University alumni
Living people
Businesspeople from Los Angeles